The 1999 Cheltenham Council election took place on 6 May 1999 to elect members of Cheltenham Borough Council in Gloucestershire, England. One third of the council was up for election and the Liberal Democrats lost overall control of the council to no overall control.

After the election, the composition of the council was
Conservative 18
Liberal Democrat 17
People Against Bureaucracy 5
Labour 1

Election result
The results saw the Conservatives become the largest party after gaining 9 seats from the Liberal Democrats, therefore depriving the Liberal Democrats of control of the council.

Ward results

References

1999 English local elections
1999
1990s in Gloucestershire